Alice Kent Stoddard (1883–1976) was an American painter of portraits, landscapes, and seascapes. Many of her works, particularly portraits, are in public collections, including University of Pennsylvania's portrait collection, Woodmere Art Museum, and other museums. She lived and painted on Monhegan Island in Maine, an enclave of artists. During World War II, she worked as a combat artist and drafted designs for airplanes. She married late in life to Joseph Pearson, who had been a friend and taught at the Pennsylvania Academy of the Fine Arts.

Personal life

Alice Kent Stoddard was born in Watertown, Connecticut in 1883. Her first cousin was artist Rockwell Kent. She rented and then bought her cousin's house known as Rockwell Kent Cottage and Studio in Monhegan, Maine.

She was good friends with fellow artist Joseph Thurman Pearson Jr., who taught at the Pennsylvania Academy of the Fine Arts. Pearson's wife, Emily, died in 1947, and Stoddard married him in 1948. They lived at "Pearson's Corner," along the Pennypack Creek, in Huntingdon Valley, Pennsylvania. Pearson died in 1951.

Education

Stoddard studied at the Philadelphia School of Design for Women, after which she studied under William Merritt Chase, Thomas Anshutz and Cecilia Beaux at the Pennsylvania Academy of the Fine Arts (PAFA). She won the Cresson Traveling Scholarship from PAFA.

Career

In 1911 and 1913, she was awarded the Mary Smith Prize from the Pennsylvania Academy of the Fine Arts for Paper Dolls.

She was a member of The Plastic Club. In 1938, she became an associate of the National Academy of Design.

Stoddard painted portraits of Philadelphia socialites, often including pets in the paintings. She painted her mother and sister in Mother and Virginia in Sitting Room about 1934. Woodmere Art Museum states, "Here she masterfully conveys the intimacy of family life... Virginia pauses while knitting, seemingly lost in thought. Across the room, Stoddard's mother focuses on a game of solitaire. The large, rectangular space between the two women emphasizes the psychological distance between them in their respective moments of quiet contemplation.

Stoddard visited and lived in Monhegan, Maine, and integrated the people and scenery in her paintings." She painted Manville Davis, a fisherman in Mending the Nets and a portrait of artist Andrew Winter. The area became an enclave for artists, some of the other artists who painted and visited there were Robert Henri, the Wyeth family (N. C., Andrew, and Jamie), and Charles Ebert.

During World War II she worked as a mechanical draftsperson for airplane design for Budd Company and as a combat artist. Her work was exhibited at Woodmere Art Museum, where she also volunteered her time.

Stoddard painted a mural in one of the courtrooms of the Family Court Building in Philadelphia. The mural featured a couple planting a tree and a family scene, within a construction area. It was one of 37 murals made in the building to depict the societal usefulness of the jurisprudence system. She won a "Small Oils Painting" medal at a Philadelphia Sketch Club.

Collections

 Alderney Library, Channel Islands
 Beatrice Fox Griffith of Haverford, West Pennsylvania, 1949
 Dallas Museum of Art
 Fisherman's Little Sister, 1915
 Ewell Sale Stewart Library, Academy of National Sciences, Philadelphia
 Charles M. B. Cadwalader
 Farnsworth Art Museum, Rockland, Maine
 Artist Sketching, 1953
 Portrait of Andrew Winter, 1953
 Franklin Institute Of Science, Philadelphia
 Benjamin Franklin
 The Monhegan Museum
 Mending Nets
 Monhegan Island Harbor Looking Toward Manana, 1910
 Portrait of Gerald Stanley, 1913
 National Academy of Design
 Self-Portrait, 
 Clarence Clark Zantzinger, 
 Oregon Historical Society, Portland
 Uncle John Stoughton
 Pennsylvania Academy of the Fine Arts
 Polly (Mrs. H. Lea Hudson)
 Elizabeth Sparhawk-Jones, before 1911
 Reading Public Museum and Art Gallery, Pennsylvania
 Leila
 Union League of Philadelphia
 Melville Griffith Baker (1875-1930), 
 University of Pennsylvania
 Francis Bernard Bracken (1869-1937), 
 Eldridge L. Eliason
 Emma Barton Gates
 Thomas Sovereign Gates, 1958
 John Claxton Gittings
 Samuel Frederick Houston
 Edwin R. Keedy
 Clarence Erwin McClung (1870-)
 Clarence Ewing McClung (1870-1946)
 William L. Mclean, 
 William Ephraim Mikell
 Roy Franklin Nichols, 1966
 Charles Root Turner, 1939
 Woodmere Art Museum, Philadelphia
 Boy with Hawk
 David Gates with Dog
 Mary Stuard Townsend Mason
 Master Pomeroy, 
 The Puppies' Angel
 Red-Headed Girl with a Doll
 James A. Waller, 1931
 Williams College Museum of Art, Massachusetts
 Harriet Walton Dunbar, 1912

References

External links

1880s births
1976 deaths
American women painters
19th-century American painters
20th-century American painters
Pennsylvania Academy of the Fine Arts alumni
Painters from Connecticut
People from Watertown, Connecticut
20th-century American women artists
19th-century American women artists
Philadelphia School of Design for Women alumni